Skjold is an army camp in the small village Øverbygd in the municipality of Målselv in Troms og Finnmark county, Norway.  This camp is part of the Northern Brigade of the Norwegian Army and is where the 2nd Battalion Mechanized Infantry and Combat and Construction Engineers are based.

References

Norwegian Army bases
Målselv
Military installations in Troms og Finnmark